The 2004 Salzburg state election was held on 7 March 2004 to elect the members of the Landtag of Salzburg.

The result was a historic victory for the Social Democratic Party of Germany (SPÖ), which became the largest party for the first time in history. The SPÖ achieved a decisive swing of over thirteen percentage points, winning 45.4% of votes cast. The Austrian People's Party (ÖVP), which had governed the state uninterrupted since 1945, fell to second place despite only small losses. Incumbent Governor Franz Schausberger did not run for re-election; rather, Wilfried Haslauer Jr. was the ÖVP's top candidate. The Freedom Party of Austria (FPÖ) lost over half its vote share and seats to the SPÖ, while The Greens made minor gains.

A coalition between the SPÖ and Greens was mathematically possible, but dismissed by the SPÖ, who had ruled out such an arrangement prior to the election. They subsequently formed a coalition with the ÖVP. Gabi Burgstaller became the first SPÖ governor of Salzburg. She became the second female state governor in Austrian history (after Waltraud Klasnic in 1996), and the first to enter office as the result of an election victory.

Background
In the 1999 election, the ÖVP remained the largest party, though the SPÖ increased their vote share by five points. The FPÖ stayed level on just under 20% of votes, and the Greens narrowly retained their presence in the Landtag. The ÖVP formed a coalition with the SPÖ.

Electoral system
The 36 seats of the Landtag of Salzburg are elected via open list proportional representation in a two-step process. The seats are distributed between six multi-member constituencies. For parties to receive any representation in the Landtag, they must either win at least one seat in a constituency directly, or clear a 5 percent state-wide electoral threshold. Seats are distributed in constituencies according to the Hare quota, with any remaining seats allocated using the D'Hondt method at the state level, to ensure overall proportionality between a party's vote share and its share of seats.

Contesting parties
The table below lists parties represented in the previous Landtag.

Results

References

Salzburg state election
State elections in Austria
Salzburg state election